The Commissioner of Docks of New York City was the head of the Department of Docks created by the New York State Legislature's 1870 revision of the New York City Charter, which returned numerous powers to the city government that had previously been taken by the state.  This version of the city charter was known as the "Tweed Charter", after its main advocate William M. "Boss" Tweed, who controlled much of local politics via the Tammany Hall political ring. At the time the charter revision passed, he was a state senator representing the Fourth District in Manhattan.

The Commissioner of Docks originally consisted of "a board consisting of five persons... appointed by the Mayor... who shall hold office for a term of five years."  Their duties were established and defined by the commissioners of the sinking fund, which was responsible for all aspects of the city's borrowing and debt.  Money for the repair and construction of wharves, piers, and slips was originally limited by the charter to $350,000, but the loose wording in this section of the charter allowed for many other expenses that quickly opened the commission to accusations of corruption, as was the case with numerous other city agencies that were controlled by Tammany Hall.

In 1873, the state legislature passed a charter revision, making the dock board a three-member commission.

Accusations of poor oversight of the docks and piers, and of the department's finances, were made from time to time, but in 1889, a scandal erupted. Two of the Dock Commissioners were charged by Mayor Hugh J. Grant with three counts of corruption – "neglect and malfeasance in office", "failure to observe and enforce provisions of law...", and "failure to acquaint themselves with the duties and necessities of the Department of Docks..." The accused commissioners countered that they had acted no differently than previous commissioners had done for decades, and that the mayor, who was a Tammany Hall crony, did not charge the third dock commissioner because he was also a Tammany Hall colleague. They were not removed from their jobs, and accusations others not collecting rents from leases of piers continued over the years.

The department was renamed the Department of Docks and Ferries in the city charter revision of 1897.  The head of the department was made a one-person commissioner, with a deputy, by the city charter revision of 1901.  The department was renamed the Department of Marine and Aviation effective January 1, 1942.

List of commissioners

References